Isaac Myrans (17 December 1872 – 25 February 1949) was a British boxer. He competed in the men's heavyweight event at the 1908 Summer Olympics.

References

External links
 

1872 births
1949 deaths
British male boxers
Olympic boxers of Great Britain
Boxers at the 1908 Summer Olympics
Place of birth missing
Heavyweight boxers